Caitlin Cary (born October 28, 1968) is an alternative country musician and visual artist from Seville, Ohio.

Early life

Caitlin Cary is the youngest of seven siblings (all older brothers). Her entire family was involved in music to some degree, with her parents' love for singing and her father's interest in building instruments. She had begun to play the violin at age five, but put it aside as a teenager. In addition to the violin, she also played her father's harpsichords, where she wrote some of her own songs.

Cary went to college at the College of Wooster in Ohio. She began working on a degree in English. While she was in college she picked up playing the violin again; she formed a small 'jokey' band called Garden Weasels. After graduating from the College of Wooster, she enrolled in the graduate program in creative  at North Carolina State.

Career

Whiskeytown
In 1993, musician Ryan Adams contacted Cary and asked her if she would play violin in a band that he was starting. Cary agreed, and they formed Whiskeytown.

Solo career
In 2000, Cary released her first solo EP Waltzie, produced by Chris Stamey.

Cary's debut album While You Weren't Looking was released in 2002 and featured Whiskeytown's Mike Daly (guitar), who co-wrote and played on most of the songs. The musicians also included Mike Santoro (bass), Skillet Gilmore (drums), and Jen Gunderman (keyboards). Thad Cockrell, Tonya Lamm (Hazeldine), and Lynn Blakey provided harmonies.

2003's I'm Staying Out featured guest appearances from Mary Chapin Carpenter, Mitch Easter, Don Dixon, Greg Humphreys,  Audley Freed, and Jane Scarpantoni.

Other projects
In 2005, Cary released an album of duets, Begonias, with Thad Cockrell with songs composed by the duo.

In 2013, Cary co-founded the North Carolina Music Love Army with Jon Lindsay. The collective of NC-based musicians created the We Are Not For Sale: Songs of Protest LP to oppose the regressive actions of the North Carolina General Assembly. The album was released worldwide via Redeye on November 26, 2013.

In 2010, Caitlin performed with Matt Douglas (lead singer and songster for The Proclivities) in Raleigh's annual Love Hangover show, in which male/female duos sing love song covers. Then they formed the group Small Ponds, who released an EP on Last Chance Records in September 2010.

Visual Arts
Cary is an accomplished visual artist and creates fabric collages she calls "Needle Print." Examples of her work are prominently featured on her website.

Personal life
Cary is married to drummer/artist Skillet Gilmore, and they live in south Raleigh, North Carolina.

Discography

Solo
Albums
 2002: While You Weren't Looking (Yep Roc)
 2003: I'm Staying Out (Yep Roc)
EPs
 2000: Waltzie (Yep Roc)
 2002: Thick Walls Down (Yep Roc)

With Whiskeytown
 1995: Faithless Street (Outpost)
 1997: Strangers Almanac (Outpost)
 2001: Pneumonia (Lost Highway)

With Tres Chicas
 2004: Sweetwater (Yep Roc)
 2006: Bloom, Red & the Ordinary Girl (Yep Roc)

With Thad Cockrell
 2005: Begonias (Yep Roc)

With The Small Ponds
 2010: Caitlin Cary & Matt Douglas Are The Small Ponds (Last Chance)

With NC Music Love Army
Albums
 2013: We Are Not For Sale: Songs Of Protest (Redeye)
Singles
 2014: "Stick To The Plan" (Bloodshot)
 2014: "Dear Mr. McCrory" (Redeye)
 2015: "The Ballad of Lennon Lacy" (Redeye)
 2016: "When You Were A young Man" (Love Army Records)

As guest artist
 2019: Horace Holloway - Tin Foil Stars (Dirtleg)
 2016: Jon Lindsay - Cities & Schools (File 13)
 2016: James Olin Oden - Deeper Dance (self-released / Bandcamp)
 2014: Ocean Carolina - All The Way Home (Old Hand)
 2013: Chris Stamey - Lovesick Blues (Yep Rock)
 2013: Kenny Roby - Memories & Birds (Little Criminal / MRI)
 2013: James Olin Oden - The Craic is Free (self-released / Bandcamp)
 2012: American Aquarium -  Burn.Flicker.Die (Last Chance)
 2012: The Riverbreaks - Wildfire (self-released)
 2011: James Olin Oden - Samhain's March: A Winter Journey (self-released / Bandcamp)
 2010: American Aquarium - Small Town Hymns (Last Chance)
 2010: Sally Spring - Made of Stars (Sniffinpup)
 2008: Yarn - Empty Pockets (Ardsley)
 2008: Chatham County Line - IV (Yep Roc)
 2008: American Aquarium: The Bible and the Bottle (self-released)
 2008: Monty Warren - Trailer Park Angel (Doublenaught)
 2007: Simon Alpin - On The Wire (Ravine)
 2007: Stephen Kellogg & the Sixers - Glassjaw Boxer (Atlantic / Everfine)
 2006: Cracker - Greenland (Cooking Vinyl)
 2006: Patty Hurst Shifter - Too Crowded on the Losing End (Evo / Blue Rose)
 2006: Sally Spring - Mockingbird (Sniffinpup)
 2005: Chatham County Line - Route 23 (Yep Roc)
 2005: Chris Stamey and Yo la Tengo - A Question of Temperature (Yep Roc)
 2005: Terry Anderson - Terry Anderson and the Olympic Ass-Kickin Team (Doublenaught)
 2004: Chris Stamey - Travels In The South (Yep Roc)
 2004: Something For Kate - The Official Fiction (Epic / Murmur)
 2003: Goner - How Good We Had It (Bifocal Media)
 2003: Something For Kate - Song For A Sleepwalker (Murmur)
 2003: Tangerine Trousers - Dressed for Success (self-released)
 2003: Thad Cockrell - Warmth & Beauty (Yep Roc)
 2001: Alejandro Escovedo - A Man Under the Influence (Bloodshot)
 2001: Greg Hawks & The Tremblers - Fool's Paradise (Yep Roc)
 2001: Hazeldine - Double Back (Glitterhouse / Okra-Tone)
 2001: Thad Cockrell - Stack of Dreams (Miles of Music)
 2000: Kenny Roby - Mercury's Blues (Glitterhouse / Rice Box)
 2000: Tami Hart - No Light in August (Mr. Lady)

As primary artist
 2004: Various Artists - Por Vida: A Tribute To The Songs Of Alejandro Escovedo (Cooking Vinyl) - disc 2 track 11, "By Eleven"

As composer
 2002: Shannon Lyon - Dharma (Inbetweens) - track 12, "Houses On The Hill" (Hidden Track) co-written with Ryan Adams
 2003: Joan Baez - Dark Chords On A Big Guitar (Koch) - track 3, "Rosemary Moore"

References

External links

Artist Page on CMT.com
Official Small Ponds site
 
 

1968 births
Living people
American alternative country singers
American women country singers
American country singer-songwriters
American violinists
Singer-songwriters from Ohio
Country musicians from Ohio
North Carolina State University alumni
People from East Cleveland, Ohio
Whiskeytown members
College of Wooster alumni
People from Seville, Ohio
21st-century violinists
Yep Roc Records artists